Mamera is a Caracas Metro station on Line 2. It was opened on 4 October 1987 as part of the inaugural section of Line 2 from La Paz to Las Adjuntas and Zoológico. Here, the line branches into two. The previous station is Antímano, the next station in the direction Zoológico is Caricuao, the next station in the direction Las Adjuntas is Ruiz Pineda.

References

Caracas Metro stations
1987 establishments in Venezuela
Railway stations opened in 1987